Jasper County is located in the southwest portion of the U.S. state of Missouri. As of the 2020 census, the population was 122,761. Its county seat is Carthage, and its largest city is Joplin. The county was organized in 1841 and named for William Jasper, a hero of the American Revolutionary War.

Jasper County is included in the Joplin Metropolitan Statistical Area. The Jasper County Sheriff's Office has legal jurisdiction throughout the county.

History

Osage Nation 
Before European contact, the area that today makes up Jasper County was the domain of the Osage Native Americans, who called themselves the "Children of the Middle Waters" (Ni-U-Kon-Ska). A Siouan language tribe, they had migrated west and south centuries before from the Ohio Valley.

They were powerful and dominated a large territory encompassed the land between the Missouri and Osage rivers to the north, the Mississippi River to the east, and the Arkansas River to the south. To the west were the Great Plains, where they hunted buffalo. By the late 17th century, the Osage were calling themselves Wah-Zha-Zhe. 

The earliest record of European-Osage contact is a 1673 map by French Jesuit priest and explorer Jacques Marquette. He noted the people he encountered as the Ouchage, his way of pronouncing the sound of the name with French spelling conventions. A few years after the Marquette expedition, French explorers discovered a Little Osage village and called it Ouazhigi. French transliterations of the tribe's name settled on a spelling of Osage, which was later adopted by English-speaking European Americans.

In 1682 Robert de La Salle canoed down the length of the Mississippi River to the Gulf of Mexico, claiming and naming the entire Mississippi basin as “La Louisiane” in honor of King Louis XIV. In 1699 Louisiana was designated as an administrative district of New France. The European colonists and nationals (France, England and Spain) considered this to be French territory. The French divided the Louisiana district into upper and lower parts, with the Arkansas River as the dividing line.

After France and Spain's defeat by Great Britain in the Seven Years' War in 1763, France ceded Louisiana to Spain and most of the rest of New France, on the east side of the Mississippi River, to the British. They exchanged Cuba with Spain and took over east Florida. For a few decades, the Spanish District of New Madrid, containing present-day Jasper County, was the southernmost of the five Spanish districts comprising Upper Louisiana. France regained control of Louisiana through the secret Treaty of San Ildefonso in 1800, but in 1803, following defeat of his troops in an effort to retake the colony of Saint Domingue in the Caribbean, Napoleon Bonaparte I decided to sell his North American territory to the United States in what is known as the Louisiana Purchase.

The Osage began treaty-making with the United States in 1808 with the first cession of lands in Missouri in the (Osage Treaty). The Osage moved from their homelands on the Osage River in 1808 to the Jasper County area of southwest Missouri. In 1825, the Osages ceded their traditional lands across present-day Missouri, Arkansas, and Oklahoma (then known as Indian Territory). They were first moved onto a southeastern Kansas reservation in the Cherokee Strip, on which the city of Independence, Kansas developed. In 1872 they were forced to move again, south to Indian Territory.

Missouri Territory

The Upper Louisiana Territory, including the Jasper County area, was renamed as the Missouri Territory on June 4, 1812, to avoid confusion with the state of Louisiana. This had joined the Union in 1812. The new New Madrid District became New Madrid County, Missouri Territory.  Old Lawrence County was established in 1815 from New Madrid County west of the St. Francis River and north of Arkansas County. It originally consisted of all of present-day southwestern Missouri and part of northwestern Arkansas.

Three years later (1818), Lawrence County was combined with part of Cape Girardeau County and renamed as Wayne County. By 1819, Arkansas Territory had been created; Wayne County lost some of its area but still consisted of most of southern Missouri: from present-day Wayne County west to the Kansas State Line and bordered on the south by the Arkansas State Line.

In 1820, all of Missouri Territory was admitted to the Union as the state of Missouri. In 1831, with increased population in the region, Crawford County was carved from the original Wayne. This new division covered all of the southern part of Missouri and included Jasper County in its boundaries.  This alignment was also short-lived; in 1833 Greene County was organized from Crawford County, and extended from the Niangua River west to the Kansas State Line.

On January 5, 1835, a big piece was cut out of Greene County and organized as Barry County. In 1838 Barry County was divided into four parts called Barry, Dade, Newton and Jasper counties. At this time Jasper was not a full-fledged county but was attached to Newton County and it would remain so until 1841.

County organization

On January 29, 1841, the Missouri Legislature enacted a bill authorizing formation of Jasper County; it was named in honor of Sergeant William Jasper, a hero in the American Revolutionary War. The Jasper County Court initially divided the area into three townships: North Fork, Center Creek and Marion. Later it was organized as 15 townships, which continue as unincorporated jurisdictions.

The county court, as a temporary seat of justice, was established on February 25, 1841, in the home of George Hornback. It was a 12×16 foot log cabin, one and a half miles northwest of Carthage on Spring River. The officers of the court were Charles S. Yancey, judge, and Elwood B. James, clerk. Mount Vernon attorney Robert W. Crawford was appointed circuit attorney pro tem. John P. Osborn, the first sheriff, gave public notice that the county court of Jasper County would meet in the home of George Hornback until the permanent seat of justice was established. The first session of the court was two days; the proceedings covered four pages of record.

A permanent county seat was chosen in March 1842 and designated by the name of Carthage. The courthouse, a one-story single-room wooden structure with a large door in the south, was completed on June 29, 1842. It was located on the north side of the present public square in Carthage. This courthouse was later replaced by a larger two-story brick-and-stone structure that was completed in 1854; it also had facilities in the building for the county jail. At the second term of the court held in October of the same year, attorneys Robert W. Crawford and John R. Chenault were cited for contempt and fined the sum of ten dollars for "fighting in the presence and view of said court during the said sitting."

At the March 1861 Secession Convention held in Jefferson City, Chenault represented Jasper County while Crawford represented Lawrence County. Possibly for their own self-preservation, and to buy time to make preparations in Southwest Missouri for the war, the two former adversaries voted in favor of keeping Missouri in the Union. Missouri was the only state whose secession convention resulted in voting to stay in the Union.

At the outset of the war Chenault, by then a circuit court judge, moved with his family to Texas. Following the Battle of Carthage, on July 12, 1861, Crawford was elected Lieutenant Colonel of the 13th Missouri Cavalry Regiment and 5th Missouri Infantry, both of the 8th Division, Missouri State Guard. They were part of the Confederate States Army (CSA), although Missouri remained with the Union. After leading the 13th Cavalry Regiment into numerous battles, in a command that included two of his sons in first lieutenant and quartermaster ranks, Crawford moved his noncombatant family to Texas for safety.

He served as a recruiter for the Confederate Army in Missouri, a post he was nominated for by Waldo P. Johnson, formerly a United States Senator from Missouri in a letter to Missouri governor-in-exile Claiborne Fox Jackson dated October 24, 1862.

By the start of the American Civil War in 1861, there were several small river mill settlements, some mining camps, and about nine or ten towns (seven platted) in Jasper County, Missouri. The county seat of Carthage, Missouri had an estimated population of between four and five hundred at that time. The newer brick courthouse was used as a hospital during the American Civil War and was destroyed by fire during fighting in October 1863. By the end of the war, Carthage had been evacuated and completely destroyed, and much of Jasper County laid in ruins. Other than military tribunals, no courts were held in Jasper County between May 11, 1861, and October 10, 1865.

By order of the Governor in 1865, the courthouse was relocated to the pioneer schoolhouse at Cave Springs (near present-day La Russell, Missouri), with John C. Price of Mount Vernon appointed as the circuit court judge. Price later (before?) served as treasurer of the United States under President James Buchanan. The county court operated in other temporary locations within the county until the current Jasper County Courthouse was constructed on Carthage square in the mid-1890s.

The county adopted an official flag in 2001, which was unveiled during the county's 160th birthday celebration. The flag depicts the county courthouse surrounded by 15 stars, representing Jasper County's 15 townships. The center blue and red stars memorialize the struggle in Jasper County during the Civil War years, including the Battle of Carthage in 1861 and second battle in 1863.

Towns established prior to the Civil War
,

Geography

On Sunday, May 22, 2011, Jasper County was struck in Joplin with a catastrophic EF5 multiple-vortex tornado. The 2011 Joplin tornado ranked as the seventh deadliest in America's history.

Adjacent counties
Barton County (north)
Dade County (northeast)
Lawrence County (east)
Newton County (south)
Cherokee County, Kansas (west)
Crawford County, Kansas (northwest)

Major highways

 Interstate 44
 Interstate 49
 U.S. Route 66 (1926–1985)
 U.S. Route 71
 Route 37
 Route 43
 Route 66
 Route 96
 Route 171
 Route 249

Demographics

As of the census of 2010, there were 117,404 people, 45,639 households, and 30,202 families residing in the county. The population density was 164 people per square mile (63/km2). There were 50,668 housing units at an average density of 71 per square mile (28/km2). The racial makeup of the county was 88.24% White, 1.93% Black or African American, 1.51% Native American, 0.99% Asian, 0.25% Pacific Islander, 3.89% from other races, and 3.18% from two or more races. Approximately 6.84% of the population were Hispanic or Latino of any race.

There were 45,639 households, out of which 30.8% had children under the age of 18 living with them, 48.7% were married couples living together, 12.4% had a female householder with no husband present, and 33.8% were non-families. 33.4% of all households were made up of individuals, and 24.8% had someone living alone who was 65 years of age or older. The average household size was 2.52 and the average family size was 3.05

In the county, the population was spread out, with 27.17% under the age of 19, 7.4% from 20 to 24, 25.11% from 25 to 44, 22.24% from 45 to 64, and 12.14% who were 65 years of age or older. The median age was 35.1 years. For every 100 females, there were 94.10 males. For every 100 females age 18 and over, there were 90.20 males.

The median income for a household in the county was $31,323, and the median income for a family was $37,611. Males had a median income of $28,573 versus $20,386 for females. The per capita income for the county was $16,227. About 10.40% of families and 14.50% of the population were below the poverty line, including 19.20% of those under age 18 and 10.30% of those age 65 or over.

2020 Census

Education

Public schools
Avilla R-XIII School District – Avilla 
Avilla Elementary/Middle School (K-08) 
Carl Junction R-I School District – Carl Junction 
Carl Junction Primary School (K-01)
Carl Junction Primary School (02-03) 
Carl Junction Intermediate School (04-06) 
Carl Junction Junior High School (07-08) 
Carl Junction High School (09-12) 
Carthage R-IX School District – Carthage 
Columbian Elementary School (PK-04) 
Fairview Elementary School (PK-04) 
Mark Twain Elementary School (PK-04) 
Pleasant Valley Elementary School (PK-04) 
Steadley Elementary School (PK-04) 
Carthage Middle School (05-06) 
Carthage Junior High School (07-08) 
Carthage High School (09-12) 
Jasper R-V School District – Jasper 
Jasper County Elementary School (K-06) 
Jasper High School (07-12) 
Joplin R-VIII School District – Joplin 
Memorial Education Center (PK) 
Cecil Floyd Elementary School (K-05) 
Columbia Elementary School (K-05) 
Soaring Heights Elementary School (K-05) 
Eastmorland Elementary School (PK-05)  
Irving Elementary School (K-05) 
Jefferson Elementary School (K-05) 
Kelsey Norman Elementary School (K-05) 
McKinley Elementary School (K-05) 
Royal Heights Elementary School (K-05)
Stapleton Elementary School (K-05) 
West Central Elementary School (K-05) 
East Middle School (06-08) 
North Middle School (06-08) 
South Middle School (06-08) 
Joplin High School (09-12) 
Sarcoxie R-II School District – Sarcoxie 
Wildwood Elementary School (PK-05) 
Sarcoxie High School (06-12) 
Webb City R-VII School District – Webb City 
Franklin Early Childhood Center (PK) 
Madge T. James Kindergarten Center (PK-K) 
Bess Truman Primary Center (K-01) 
Webster Primary Center (01-02) 
Carterville Elementary School (PK-04) 
Eugene Field Elementary School (03-04) 
Harry S. Truman Elementary School (02-04) 
Mark Twain Elementary School (03-04) 
Webb City Middle School (05-06) 
Webb City Junior High School (07-08) 
Webb City High School  (09-12)

Private schools
Thomas Jefferson Independent Day School – Joplin (K-12) – Nonsectarian (Special Education) 
Joplin Area Catholic Schools – Joplin (PK-12) – Roman Catholic 
St. Mary's Elementary School (PK-05) 
St. Peter's Middle School (06-08) 
McAuley Catholic High School (09-12) 
Martin Luther School – Joplin (PK-08) – Lutheran 
College Heights Christian School – Joplin (PK-12) – Nondenominational Christian 
St. Ann’s Catholic School – Carthage (PK-06) – Roman Catholic

Post-secondary
Missouri Southern State University - Joplin. A public, four-year university.
Ozark Christian College - Joplin. A private, four-year college associated with the independent Christian churches and churches of Christ.

Public libraries
Carthage Public Library  
Joplin Public Library  
Sarcoxie Public Library  
Webb City Public Library

Politics

Local
The Republican Party completely controls politics at the local level in Jasper County. Republicans hold every elected position in the county.
In 2016, Hillary Clinton received 21.9% of the vote in Jasper County, lower than any Democratic presidential candidate in the county's history.

State

Jasper County is divided into four districts in the Missouri House of Representatives, all of which are held by Republicans.

District 127 — Mike Kelley (R-Lamar) Consists of the communities of Alba, Asbury, Avilla, Carytown, Jasper, La Russell, Neck City, Purcell, Reeds, Sarcoxie, and Waco.   

District 161 — Bill White (R-Joplin) Consists of the communities of Duquesne and part of Joplin.

District 162 — Charlie Davis (R-Webb City) Consists of the communities of Airport Drive, Duenweg, and parts of Carl Junction, Carterville, Joplin, and Webb City.

District 163 — Cody Smith (R-Carthage) Consists of  communities of Carthage, Fidelity, Oronogo, and parts of Carl Junction, Carterville, and Webb City. 

All of Jasper County is a part of Missouri's 32nd District in the Missouri Senate and is represented by Ron Richard (R-Joplin).

Federal

All of Jasper County is included in Missouri's 7th Congressional District and is represented by Billy Long (R-Springfield) in the U.S. House of Representatives.

Communities

Cities

Alba
Asbury
Carl Junction
Carterville
Carthage (county seat)
Duenweg
Jasper  
Joplin (small portion in Newton County; largest city)
La Russell
Neck City
Oronogo
Purcell
Reeds
Sarcoxie
Waco
Webb City

Villages
Airport Drive
Avilla
Brooklyn Heights
Carytown
Duquesne
Fidelity

Unincorporated communities

 Belleville
 Bowers Mill
 Dudenville
 Galesburg
 Kendricktown
 Knights
 Lone Elm
 Maple Grove
 Maxville
 Medoc
 Parshley
 Preston
 Prosperity
 Scotland
 Tuckahoe

Former community
Oakland Park

Townships

 Duval
 Galena
 Jackson
 Jasper
 Joplin
 Lincoln
 Madison
 Marion
 McDonald
 Mineral
 Preston
 Sarcoxie
 Sheridan
 Twin Groves
 Union

See also
 National Register of Historic Places listings in Jasper County, Missouri

References

External links
 Jasper County clerk discovers historic documents from 1841
 Digitized Historical Photos of Jasper County from large digital online collection from various public and public domain archival sources. Photos of historical homes, towns, scenes, streets and neighborhoods in Jasper County, Missouri
 Digitized 1930 Plat Book of Jasper County  from University of Missouri Division of Special Collections, Archives, and Rare Books
 Jasper County Mississippi Historical Pages, by Keith Eddins Wilkerson (accessed September 28, 2016). Information about extinct communities, the early growth of towns, etc.

 
1841 establishments in Missouri
Populated places established in 1841
Joplin, Missouri, metropolitan area